Fennassa Bab El Hit is a commune in the Taounate Province of the Taza-Al Hoceima-Taounate administrative region of Morocco. At the time of the 2004 census, the commune had a total population of 12764 people living in 2108 households.

References

Populated places in Taounate Province
Rural communes of Fès-Meknès